Falck may refer to:

 Falck (surname)
 Falck (emergency services company), Danish emergency service corporation
 Falck Group, Italian steel mill company
 Falck Renewables, Italian renewable energy project developer
 Falck USA, American emergency services company
 Group 4 Falck, Danish security company
 Falck, Moselle, commune of the Moselle département in France

See also 
 Falk (disambiguation)
Surnames from nicknames